Somatina accraria is a moth of the family Geometridae first described by Charles Swinhoe in 1904. It is found in Ghana.

References

Endemic fauna of Ghana
Moths described in 1904
Scopulini
Insects of West Africa
Moths of Africa